Lionel White (9 July 1905 – 26 December 1985) was an American journalist and crime novelist, several of whose dark, noirish stories were made into films. His books include The Snatchers (made into a film as The Night of the Following Day directed by Hubert Cornfield and starring Marlon Brando), The Money Trap (made into a movie by Burt Kennedy starring Glenn Ford and Elke Sommer), Clean Break (adapted by Stanley Kubrick as the basis for his 1956 film The Killing), Obsession (adapted by Jean-Luc Godard as the basis for his 1965 film Pierrot le fou and by the Finnish director Seppo Huunonen for the 1974 film The Hair), and Rafferty, adapted by 1980 Soviet Lenfilm production of the same title.

White (also known as L.W. Blanco) had been a crime reporter and began writing suspense novels in the 1950s. He wrote more than 35 books, all translated into a number of different languages. His earlier novels were published as Gold Medal crime fiction, but when Duttons began a line of mystery and suspense books, he also wrote for them. He was best known as what a New York Times review described as "the master of the big caper."

Seven years after White's death, director Quentin Tarantino credited him, among others, as an inspiration in his 1992 film Reservoir Dogs.

Novels

Seven Hungry Men! (1952)
The Snatchers (1953) (filmed in 1968 as The Night of the Following Day)
To Find a Killer (also released as Before I Die) (1954)
The Big Caper (1955) (filmed in 1957 under the same title)
Clean Break (1955) (filmed in 1955 as The Killing)
Flight into Terror (1955)
Love Trap (1955)
Operation - Murder (1956)
The House Next Door (1956)
A Right for Murder (1957)
Death Takes the Bus (1957)
Hostage for a Hood (1957)
Coffin for a Hood (1958)
Invitation to Violence (1958)
Too Young to Die (1958)
Rafferty (Soviet filmed in 1980 under the same title)
Run, Killer, Run! (1959)
The Merriweather File (1959) (televised in 1961 under the same name as an episode of Thriller)
Steal Big (1960)
Lament for a Virgin (1960)
Marilyn K. (1960)
The Time of Terror (1960)
A Death at Sea (1961)
A Grave Undertaking (1961)
Obsession (1962) (filmed in 1965 as Pierrot le Fou, without credit; also filmed in 1974 as Karvat) 
The Money Trap (1963) (filmed in 1965 under the same title)
The Ransomed Madonna (1964)
The House on K Street (1965) (not historical fiction but a murder mystery; title references political corruption in general) 
A Party to Murder (1966)
The Mind Poisoners (1966) (Killmaster novel begun under the Nick Carter pseudonym; Valerie Moolman took over and finished the novel)
The Crimshaw Memorandum (1967)
The Night of the Rape (1967)
Hijack (1969)
Death of a City (1970)
A Rich and Dangerous Game (1974)
The Mexico Run (1974)
Jailbreak (1976)
The Walled Yard (1978)

References

External links
 
 Short bio at Good Reads
 List of writings, organized by date
 Partial filmography  at Fandango

1905 births
1985 deaths
American crime fiction writers
Journalists from New York City
Pulp fiction writers
20th-century American novelists
American male novelists
20th-century American male writers
Novelists from New York (state)
20th-century American non-fiction writers
American male non-fiction writers